Hezy Leskly (July 26, 1952 – May 26, 1994) was an Israeli poet, choreographer, painter and dance critic.

Biography
Yehezkel (Hezy) Leskly was born in Rehovot to Czech-Jewish parents who survived the Holocaust. His father’s first wife and child were murdered. The family moved to Givatayim early in his childhood. 

Leskly wrote his first poems at 14 and published in magazines at the age of 18. At age 22, Leskly moved to The Hague in the Netherlands where he studied dancing and art. He worked as a painter and a choreographer, and published four books of poems. One of his most widely known works was Dutch Poetry - Four Imagined Dutch Poets and a Nonexistent Israeli Poet, published in 1992.

Leskly was among the first Israelis to identify as gay and was active in many LGBT organisations. The primary topics of Leskly's poetry were homosexual life and dance.

Death
Leskly died as a result of AIDS-related complications in Givatayim on May 26, 1994 at the age of 41. He was interred at Kiryat Shaul Cemetery.

See also
Dance of Israel
Israeli literature

References

1952 births
1994 deaths
People from Rehovot
People from Givatayim
Israeli male painters
Israeli male poets
Israeli choreographers
Israeli art critics
Israeli expatriates in the Netherlands
20th-century Israeli male artists
20th-century Israeli male writers
20th-century Israeli poets
20th-century Israeli painters
Israeli people of Czech-Jewish descent
20th-century Israeli Jews
Jewish Israeli artists
Jewish Israeli writers
Israeli gay writers
Israeli gay artists
Israeli LGBT painters
Israeli LGBT poets
LGBT choreographers
Gay Jews
Gay painters
Gay poets
20th-century Israeli LGBT people
AIDS-related deaths in Israel
Burials at Kiryat Shaul Cemetery